The Federation of Health and Social Health (FSS) is a trade union representing workers in the health sector in Spain.

The union was founded in 1977, as the National Federation of Health, and it affiliated to the Workers' Commissions.  By 1981, it had 4,700 members, but by 1995 its membership had grown to 39,485.

References

External links

Healthcare trade unions
Trade unions established in 1977
Trade unions in Spain